Ellesse is an Italian sport apparel company originally founded in 1959 in Umbria, Italy. It has been part of the British Pentland Group since 1987.

History

Ellesse was founded by Leonardo "Mantis" Servadio on 19 June 1959 in Perugia, Umbria, Italy. The name Ellesse derives from Servadio's initials, "L.S.", which are spoken "elle" and "esse" in Italian.

Ellesse grew in popularity during the 1970s as a producer of skiwear, such as quilted jackets and ski pants. In 1979, Ellesse's Jet Pant, a ski pant featuring padded knees and a wide lower leg to fit around a ski boot, was included in an event at the Pompidou Centre in Paris celebrating Italian design.

Another sport with which Ellesse has been closely associated since its early years is tennis. The Ellesse logo references the form of a tennis ball with the shape of the tips of a pair of skis.

Through the 1970s and 1980s, Ellesse gained a reputation for combining sportswear functionality with street-level fashion styling. It was one of the first sportswear brands to feature their logo prominently on the outside of their garments. During the mid-1980s, French designer Jean-Charles de Castelbajac worked with Ellesse, an early collaboration between a sportswear company and a fashion designer. The UK casuals adopted the brand in the 1980s as premium sportswear took off across British lad culture.

Celebrity endorsements
A number of sports celebrities have endorsed Ellesse, including tennis players Tommy Haas, Chris Evert, Guillermo Vilas, Boris Becker, Mats Wilander, Pat Cash, Arantxa Sánchez, Anna Kournikova and Jose Vilela, skiers Marc Girardelli and Jean-Luc Crétier, and Formula 1 driver Alain Prost.

Other celebrities associated with the brand include boxer Muhammad Ali, Liam Smith, Natas Kaupas and Maurice Cheeks, and actors Brigitte Nielsen and Roger Moore.

Ellesse also ventured into football sponsorship, and it manufactured the kits for the New York Cosmos in the 1980s.

On May 11, 2019, popular DJ Solomun can be seen wearing a black jacket sporting the Ellesse logo during his performance at Château de Chambord during the Cercle x Chambord Festival.

In October 2021, Elesse partnered with the YouTube group The Sidemen in a collaboration with their own clothing brand, SDMN.

Purchase by Pentland Group
In 1994, British brand management company Pentland Group purchased 90% of the shares of Ellesse for £20 million. Pentland had been Ellesse's UK distributor since 1981. Servadio retained 10% of the shares.

Pentland Group also owns other well-known sportswear brands, such as Berghaus and Speedo. It currently licenses the Ellesse brand to partners in countries around the world, who manufacture and distribute Ellesse products in their territory.

In 2009, Ellesse celebrated its 50th anniversary with a party in Rome in July 2009.

See also

Diadora
Erreà
Fila
Kappa

References

External links
 
 Pentland Group website
 Interviews with Leonardo Servadio

Clothing companies of Italy
Sporting goods manufacturers of Italy
Sportswear brands
Companies based in Perugia
Clothing companies established in 1959
Italian companies established in 1959
Italian brands
Swimwear manufacturers